Union County is the southernmost county in the U.S. state of South Dakota. As of the 2020 United States Census, the population was 16,811, making it the 13th most populous county in South Dakota. Its county seat has been Elk Point since April 30, 1865. Originally named Cole County, its name was changed to Union on January 7, 1864, because of Civil War sentiment.

Union County is part of the Sioux City, IA–NE–SD Metropolitan Statistical Area. The Progressive Farmer rated Union County second in the "2006 Best Place to Live Survey" in the U.S., because "its schools are good, its towns neat and its people friendly".

History
Founded on April 10, 1862, as Cole County, it was renamed Union County on January 7, 1864, when its boundaries were changed to encompass land previously part of neighboring Lincoln County. The county seat was moved from Richland to Elk Point on April 30, 1865.

Geography
Union County lies on the southeast corner of South Dakota. Its east boundary line abuts the west boundary line of the State of Iowa (across the Big Sioux River), and its south/southwest boundary line abuts the north boundary line of the State of Nebraska (across the Missouri River). The Brule Creek flows southeasterly across the central part of the county, emptying into the Big Sioux. The county terrain consists of rolling hills, devoted to agriculture except around built-up areas. The terrain slopes to the south and east; its highest point is near its northwest corner, at 1,509' (460m) ASL. It is the fifth-smallest county in South Dakota by area.

Major highways

  Interstate 29
  South Dakota Highway 11
  South Dakota Highway 19
  South Dakota Highway 46
  South Dakota Highway 48
  South Dakota Highway 50
  South Dakota Highway 105

Adjacent counties

 Lincoln County to the north
 Sioux County, Iowa to the northeast
 Plymouth County, Iowa to the east
 Woodbury County, Iowa to the southeast
 Dakota County, Nebraska to the south
 Dixon County, Nebraska to the southwest
 Clay County to the west

Protected areas

 Adams Homestead and State Nature Preserve
 Bent River State Game Production Area
 Bolton State Game Production Area
 Cusick State game Production Area
 Cut Off Bend State Game Production Area
 Missouri National Recreational River (partial)
 Petry-Conway State Game Production Area
 Petry/Harmelink State Game Production Area
 Ryan State Game Production Area
 Union Grove State Park
 Warren Wilderness State Game Production Area

Lakes
 Burbank Lake (partial)
 McCook Lake
 Mud Lake

Demographics

2000 census
As of the 2000 United States Census, there were 12,584 people, 4,927 households, and 3,517 families in the county. There were 5,345 housing units at an average density of 12 per square mile (4/km2). The racial makeup of the county was 96.85% White, 1.34% Asian, 0.37% Native American, 0.01% Pacific Islander, 0.33% Black or African American, 0.24% from other races, and 0.87% from two or more races. 1.26% of the population were Hispanic or Latino of any race.

There were 4,927 households, out of which 34.80% had children under the age of 18 living with them, 62.00% were married couples living together, 6.30% had a female householder with no husband present, and 28.60% were non-families. 24.20% of all households were made up of individuals, and 10.30% had someone living alone who was 65 years of age or older.  The average household size was 2.53 and the average family size was 3.02.

The county population contained 27.00% under the age of 18, 7.30% from 18 to 24, 28.40% from 25 to 44, 23.70% from 45 to 64, and 13.50% who were 65 years of age or older. The median age was 37 years. For every 100 females, there were 99.20 males. For every 100 females age 18 and over, there were 98.30 males.

The median income for a household in the county was $44,790, and the median income for a family was $51,227. Males had a median income of $35,406 versus $23,440 for females. The per capita income for the county was $24,355. About 3.70% of families and 5.50% of the population were below the poverty line, including 4.90% of those under age 18 and 10.70% of those age 65 or over.

2010 census
As of the 2010 United States Census, there were 14,399 people, 5,756 households, and 4,043 families in the county. The racial makeup of the county was 95.5% white, 0.9% Asian, 0.7% black or African American, 0.6% American Indian, 0.1% Pacific islander, 0.7% from other races, and 1.6% from two or more races. Those of Hispanic or Latino origin made up 2.1% of the population. In terms of ancestry, 42.0% were German, 18.2% were Norwegian, 17.7% were Irish, 7.9% were English, 6.8% were Swedish, and 3.7% were American.

Of the 5,756 households, 32.8% had children under the age of 18 living with them, 58.9% were married couples living together, 7.5% had a female householder with no husband present, 29.8% were non-families, and 25.1% of all households were made up of individuals. The average household size was 2.49 and the average family size was 2.98. The median age was 40.2 years.

The median income for a household in the county was $59,889 and the median income for a family was $71,308. Males had a median income of $42,702 versus $31,993 for females. The per capita income for the county was $33,783. About 3.9% of families and 4.9% of the population were below the poverty line, including 4.3% of those under age 18 and 10.5% of those age 65 or over.

Communities

Cities

 Alcester
 Beresford (partial)
 Elk Point (county seat)
 Jefferson
 North Sioux City

Census-designated places
 Dakota Dunes
 Richland

Unincorporated communities

Alsen
 Garryowen
 Junction City
 McCook Lake
 Midway
 Nora
 Spink
 Wynstone

Ghost towns

 Emmet
 Gothland (Alcester Twp)
 Hill Side (Emmet Twp)
 Texas (Elk Point Twp)
 Morganfield

Townships

 Alcester
 Big Sioux
 Big Springs
 Brule
 Civil Bend
 Elk Point
 Emmet
 Jefferson
 Prairie
 Richland
 Sioux Valley
 Spink
 Virginia

Unorganized territory
 Richland

Politics
Union County voters were more politically centered in times past, but the county has selected the Republican Party candidate in every national election since 2000 (as of 2020).

See also
 National Register of Historic Places listings in Union County, South Dakota

References

External links
 Union County Historical Society website
 2nd Best Place to Live in 2006 from the Progressive Farmer website

 
1862 establishments in Dakota Territory
Populated places established in 1862
Sioux City metropolitan area
South Dakota counties on the Missouri River